Il était une fois l'indépendance is a 2009 Malian film.

Synopsis 
Nama and Siré marry in the early sixties. Nama is a very pious marabout who decides to pull away from the world with his wife to dedicate himself fully to God and live as a hermit. To reward him, God sends him an angel. Nama must make three wishes.

This film is based on a traditional Malian tale.

Awards 
 Festival Internacional de Cine de Ouidah (Benín) 2009
 Festival de cortos francófonos de Vaulx-en-Velin (Francia) 2010

External links 

2009 films
French drama films
Malian drama films
2000s French films